Stefan Stefanović (1807–1828) was a Serbian writer and playwright who is best remembered for the popular play about Stefan Uroš V of Serbia.

Biography
Stefan Stefanović, who lived and worked in Novi Sad and Budapest, is said to have been only nineteen years of age when he wrote the 1826 tragic drama "Death of Stefan Uroš V the Last Serbian Tsar", which would place his birth about the year 1807. He was Vuk Karadžić's disciple. He wrote an "Ode to Vuk Karadžić" in the same reformed language that Vuk was advocating, and had it published in Srpski Letopis in 1826. Stefanović read German authors in the original language and translated them into modern Serbian. He was an ardent admirer of Schiller. He preferred a life of study and writing to the military service in which his peers were distinguished. He basically lived all his life in Novi Sad where he was born and Pest, Hungary, where he studied. There his time was also spent in literary pursuits, however short it turned out to be.

His drama, "Death of Uroš V the Last Serbian Tsar", was inspired by Serbian Patriarch Pajsije I Janjevac (1614–1647) who wrote the biography of the last Serbian emperor, Uroš, and composed a service to him. Stefanović's drama about the life and death of the last Serbian tsar — Stefan Uroš V of Serbia — was frequently performed and it was popular at the time. It is assumed that such a theatrical performance must have been the source of inspiration for the painting of the scene subject by Serbian artist Novak Radonić in 1857.

Stefan Stefanović died in 1828, in Novi Sad, afflicted with tuberculosis. He was 21. On his tombstone, his sister gave the date of birth and death: "1807–1828."

References
 
 
 http://www.equilibrium.rs/knjiga/A-03505/smrt-urosa-petog-tragedija-u-pet-cinova

1807 births
1828 deaths
Writers from Novi Sad
19th-century deaths from tuberculosis
19th-century Serbian people
Tuberculosis deaths in Serbia